Exam is a 2003 Romanian drama film directed by Titus Muntean.

Cast 
 Marius Stănescu as Cristi Sandulescu
 Gheorghe Dinică as Dumitrascu
 Clara Vodă as Nora Sandulescu
 Gheorghe Visu as Stanciu
 Coca Bloos as Doina Ruznici
 Valentin Uritescu as Nea Grigore
 Alexandra Dinu as Alina Bradean 
 Mihai Dinvale as Mircea
  as Cosma Ruznici
  as Maior militie
 Eugen Cristian Motriuc as Capitan miliitie 
 Emil Hostina as Lt. Major militie

Reception 
Exam received positive reviews in Romania but was not widely distributed internationally.

References

External links 

2003 films
2003 drama films
Romanian drama films
2000s Romanian-language films